INS Mahé was an Indian Naval minesweeper, named after a former French colony Mahé in the west coast of India commissioned in 1983. She remained in service until decommissioned at Naval Base, Kochi on 15 May 2006.

Service

The ship was commissioned by Vice Admiral K. K. Nayyar, the then Flag Officer Commanding-in-Chief Southern Naval Command, on 16 May 1983 at Kochi.

She was decommissioned at Kochi Naval Base in the presence of Flag Officer Commanding-in-Chief of Southern Naval Command, Vice Admiral Jagjit Singh Bedi.     With the sounding of the 'Last post', the paying off pennant was hauled down to an end her 24 years of commission in the Indian naval service.

The Admiral inspected a 50-man guard of honor and Lt Cdr Boyiri Varma, the last commanding officer of INS Mahé, delivered the pre-decommissioning speech. At sunset, the Color Guard presented arms as the National Flag and the Naval Ensign were hauled down.

References

Mahé-class minesweepers